Antisindris is a monotypic snout moth genus. Its only species, Antisindris bipunctalis, is found on Madagascar. Both the genus and species were first described by Hubert Marion in 1955.

References

Pyralinae
Monotypic moth genera
Moths of Madagascar
Pyralidae genera